Kenneth Andrews may refer to:

 Kenneth Andrews (sociologist), professor of sociology at the University of North Carolina at Chapel Hill
 Kenneth R. Andrews (1916–2005), academic who wrote and thought on business policy or corporate strategy at the Harvard Business School
 Kenneth Andrews (historian), British historian
 Kenny Andrews, British motorcycle sidecar racing champion
 Ken Andrews, American musician